Camden Pulkinen (born March 25, 2000) is an American figure skater. He competed at the 2016 Winter Youth Olympics and is the first male figure skater to compete on behalf of Team USA in the men's singles event at the Winter Youth Olympic Games. He is the 2017–18 Junior Grand Prix Final silver medalist, a two-time JGP Austria champion (2017, 2018), and the 2018 U.S. national junior champion. He finished within the top five at the 2022 World Championships and within the top six at the 2018 World Junior Championships. He is the former world record holder for the junior men's short program.

Personal life 
Pulkinen was born on March 25, 2000, in Scottsdale, Arizona. His older sister, Elena, has also competed in figure skating. Pulkinen's father is of Finnish and French descent, and his mother is from Thailand. He attended Hamilton High School in Chandler, Arizona. Pulkinen attended University of Colorado Colorado Springs part-time for a few years before transferring to Columbia University in August 2022, where he plans to study financial economics.

Career

Early career 
Pulkinen began learning to skate in 2005. He competed on the juvenile level beginning in the 2010–2011 season. He moved up to the intermediate level in 2013–2014 and to the novice ranks the following season.

2015–2016 season 
Pulkinen moved up to the junior level in the 2015–2016 season. He was coached by Karen Gesell at the Coyotes Skating Club in Scottsdale, Arizona.

After winning the Golden West Championships, he was nominated to represent the United States at the 2016 Winter Youth Olympics in Hamar, Norway. He placed seventh at the competition, held in February 2016.

2016–2017 season 
Pulkinen relocated to Colorado Springs, Colorado in June 2016. Tom Zakrajsek, Becky Calvin, and Drew Meekins became his coaches.

His ISU Junior Grand Prix (JGP) came in October 2016 in Tallinn, Estonia; he finished ninth at the event. In January 2017, he won the junior silver medal at the 2017 U.S. Championships.

2017–2018 season 
Making his senior international debut, Pulkinen placed eleventh at the Philadelphia Summer International in early August 2017. He then returned to the junior level, winning gold at a 2017 JGP competition in September in Salzburg, Austria. A month later, he took silver at a JGP event in Gdańsk, Poland, and qualified to the JGP Final in Nagoya, Japan. In Nagoya, Japan, he won the silver medal at the JGP Final. After the final, he won gold at the 2018 U.S. national in Junior men. In March, he competed at the 2018 World Junior Championships and placed sixth.

2018–2019 season 
Pulkinen trained in Colorado Springs, Colorado, under Tom Zakrajsek and also got help from Tammy Gambill and Christy Krall. He worked with Tom Dickson and Drew Meekins on choreography, Becky Calvin on basics, and Eddie Shipstead and Erick Schulz on jump and pole harness. Off the ice, he worked with Anna Weslin on dance and Brandon Siakel for strength training.

In early August 2018, Pulkinen placed fourth in the senior ranks at the Philadelphia Summer International. Competing in the 2018–2019 ISU Junior Grand Prix series, he won gold in Linz, Austria.  At his second JGP event, he won the silver medal in Ostrava, Czech Republic, setting a world junior record in the short program in the process.  His placements in Linz and Ostrava qualified him to the 2018–19 Junior Grand Prix Final in Vancouver, Canada.

Pulkinen next competed at the senior level at the 2018 CS Alpen Trophy, his debut on the Challenger series.  He placed fourth in the short, sixth in the free, and sixth overall. At the 2018–19 Junior Grand Prix Final, Pulkinen placed first in the short program but sixth in the free skate, with three falls and other jump errors. As a result, he dropped to fifth place overall. Pulkinen commented afterward that he believed he had not trained the free skate sufficiently.

In late January 2019, he finished twelfth at the U.S. national championships, placing eighth in the short program and fifteenth in the free skate.  After attending the US junior camp, he was nevertheless named to the US team for the 2019 World Junior Championships. He placed first in the short program there, winning a gold small medal, but struggled again in the free skate, where he placed ninth. He finished eighth overall.

In May 2019, Pulkinen announced that he had left coach Tom Zakrajsek to train under Tammy Gambill and Damon Allen.

2019–2020 season: Grand Prix debut 
Pulkinen began his first full senior season at the Philadelphia Summer International, where he placed fifth.  He was fifth as well at the 2019 CS Autumn Classic International.

Pulkinen made his senior Grand Prix debut at the 2019 Skate Canada International, where he placed second in the short program, landing a ratified quad toe loop.  He dropped to fourth place following the free skate, nevertheless setting a new personal best in that segment and in total score.  Pulkinen had less success at the 2019 Cup of China, placing eighth.

Competing at the 2020 U.S. Championships, Pulkinen was seventh in the short program after errors on both his triple Axel and jump combination.  Despite some difficult jump landings in the free skate, he remained in seventh overall.  Pulkinen was assigned to compete at the 2020 Four Continents Championships in Seoul.  Pulkinen placed eleventh at Four Continents.

2020–2021 season 
Pulkinen competed in a virtual Peggy Fleming Trophy artistic contest in the summer.  With the coronavirus pandemic affecting international travel, assignments for the Grand Prix were made primarily based on training location, resulting in Pulkinen being assigned to the 2020 Skate America. He placed ninth at the event.

Pulkinen placed eighth at the 2021 U.S. Championships. He commented afterward that it had been a "difficult season" but that he was anticipating preparing for the next year.

2021–2022 season: World Championships debut 
Beginning the season at the 2021 U.S. Classic, Pulkinen placed fourth. He withdrew from the 2021 CS Asian Open, instead competing at the 2021 CS Finlandia Trophy, where he finished in fourteenth position.  

On the Grand Prix, Pulkinen placed eleventh of eleven skaters at the 2021 NHK Trophy. He was seventh at the 2021 Rostelecom Cup and said it "definitely could have been better, but I am happy that I could improve from NHK Trophy." 

Pulkinen delivered one of the strongest performances of his career at the 2022 U.S. Championships, where he finished fifth. He reflected, "last year was really tough for me, so this whole season was about progressing up to the U.S. championships, so I’m happy to have done that." He next competed at the 2022 Four Continents Championships, where he was twelfth. 

As second alternate, Pulkinen was called on to compete in his World Championships debut following Nathan Chen's withdrawal. He placed twelfth in the short program, third in the free skate, and fifth overall, scoring personal bests in each segment and earning a small bronze medal for the free skate.

2022–2023 season 
Beginning the season on the Challenger series, Pulkinen won the bronze medal at the 2022 CS U.S. Classic, his first international medal at the senior level. He was fifth at the 2022 Skate Canada International, his first Grand Prix assignment, and fifth as well at the 2022 Grand Prix of Espoo.

Programs

Records and achievements

Junior world record scores 
Pulkinen has set two junior world record scores under the new +5 / -5 GOE (Grade of Execution) system.

Competitive highlights
GP: Grand Prix; CS: Challenger Series; JGP: Junior Grand Prix. Pewter medals (4th place) awarded only at U.S. national, sectional, and regional events.

Junior and senior career

Juvenile, intermediate, and novice career

Detailed results

Senior level 

Small medals for short and free programs awarded only at ISU Championships. Pewter medals (fourth place) awarded only at U.S. domestic events. Current ISU world bests highlighted in bold and italic. Personal bests highlighted in bold.

Junior level 

Small medals for short and free programs awarded only at ISU Championships. Pewter medals (fourth place) awarded only at U.S. domestic events. Current ISU world bests highlighted in bold and italic. Personal bests highlighted in bold.

References

External links
 
 
 Camden Pulkinen at IceNetwork.com

2000 births
American male single skaters
Living people
Sportspeople from Scottsdale, Arizona
Figure skaters at the 2016 Winter Youth Olympics

! colspan="3" style="border-top: 5px solid #78FF78;" |World Junior Record Holders

Columbia University alumni